Pools orkester was a dansband from Sweden. The band scored successes by the early 1990s when Lisbet Jagedal used to sing with the band.

Discography

Albums
"Lisbet Jagedal & Pools orkester" - 1990
"Himlen är nära" - 1994

Svensktoppen songs
"Du har det där" - 1993
"För varje andetag" - 1994

References 

Dansbands
Swedish musical groups